Bob Cheyne (born 14 December 1947) is a Canadian sports shooter. He competed in two events at the 1984 Summer Olympics.

References

1947 births
Living people
Canadian male sport shooters
Olympic shooters of Canada
Shooters at the 1984 Summer Olympics
Sportspeople from Vancouver
20th-century Canadian people